Wu Zhiyu (born 9 September 1983 in Shanghai) is a Chinese water polo player who was a member of the gold medal-winning team at the 2006 Asian Games. Wu also competed in the 2008 Summer Olympics.

References
 profile

1983 births
Living people
Chinese male water polo players
Olympic water polo players of China
Water polo players at the 2008 Summer Olympics
Sportspeople from Shanghai
Asian Games medalists in water polo
Water polo players at the 2006 Asian Games
Medalists at the 2006 Asian Games
Asian Games gold medalists for China
21st-century Chinese people